Yale Blue is the dark azure color used in association with Yale University.

History

Since the 1850s, Yale Crew has rowed in blue uniforms, and in 1894, "dark blue" was officially adopted as Yale's color, after half a century of the university being associated with green. In 1901, this was amended to "dark blue of the shade known as the color of the University of Oxford", although  Oxford Blue, while only 2° different in hue, is now substantially darker than Yale Blue, with a brightness of 28% compared to Yale Blue's 42%. In 2005, University Printer John Gambell was asked to standardize the color. He had characterized its spirit as "a strong, relatively dark blue, neither purple nor green, though it can be somewhat gray. It should be a color you would call blue." A vault in the university secretary's office holds two scraps of silk, apocryphally from a bolt of cloth for academic robes, preserved as the first official Yale Blue.

The university administration defines Yale Blue as a custom color whose closest approximation in the Pantone system is Pantone 289. Yale Blue inks may be ordered from the Superior Printing Ink Co., formulas 6254 and 6255.

Other uses
Yale Blue is one of the two official colors of Indiana State University, the University of Mississippi, and Southern Methodist University. The official color "DCU Blue" of Dublin City University is Pantone 289, very close to Yale Blue, but with no acknowledged connection.

Yale Blue is an official color of the University of California, Berkeley, adopted in 1868 by the university's founders who were mostly Yale graduates. However, UC Berkeley uses a slightly different shade, Pantone 282, from that adopted by Yale.

The color is similar to Duke University's Duke Blue as both are derived from prussian blue, where Pantone 289 remains an acceptable approximation.

The zine produced by Yale's campus radio station WYBC is named Relatively Dark Blue Neither Purple Nor Green in reference to Gambell's description of the color.

See also
Columbia blue
Duke blue
Tiffany Blue
Yale (typeface)
Lists of colors

References

External links
 Yale Alumni Magazine slide show about Yale Blue

Culture of Yale University
Shades of blue
School colors